Angelo Kelly-Rosales (born 25 January 1993) is a Honduran footballer who currently plays for One Knoxville SC in the USL League One.

Early life
Kelly-Rosales was born in Honduras, but grew up in Ottumwa, Iowa in the United States.

Career

College
Kelly-Rosales played four years of college soccer at William Penn University between 2012 and 2015, making 75 appearances, scoring 18 goals and tallying 20 assists.

Semi-professional
Following college, Kelly-Rosales appeared in the Premier Development League with Thunder Bay Chill in 2015, Midland/Odessa Sockers in 2016 and Mississippi Brilla in 2017.

Professional
In March 2018, Kelly-Rosales signed with United Soccer League club Charleston Battery. He made his professional debut on March 24, 2018, as an injury-time substitute in a 1-0 win over Penn FC.

The Honduran midfielder made 17 appearances in 2020. Angelo was one of four Battery players to appear in all 17 matches during the campaign. Kelly finished second on the team in long pass success rate at 64.4% and provided a team-high three assists, tied with AJ Paterson, in his third season in Charleston.

On January 24, 2022, Kelly-Rosales signed with USL Championship side Pittsburgh Riverhounds.

On December 13, 2022, Kelly-Rosales joined USL League One side One Knoxville SC.

References

1993 births
Living people
American soccer players
Association football midfielders
Charleston Battery players
Honduran emigrants to the United States
Honduran footballers
Midland-Odessa Sockers FC players
Mississippi Brilla players
Pittsburgh Riverhounds SC players
People from Ottumwa, Iowa
Soccer players from Iowa
Thunder Bay Chill players
USL Championship players
USL League Two players
William Penn Statesmen men's soccer players
One Knoxville SC players